Mecyclothorax fleutiauxi is a species of ground beetle in the subfamily Psydrinae. It was described by Jeannel in 1944.

References

fleutiauxi
Beetles described in 1944